Dalibor Starčević (Arabic: داليبور; born January 22, 1975, in Croatia) is a Croatian football manager and former player who now works as head coach of Al-Fahaheel in Kuwait.

Career
Starčević started his managerial career with NK Krk. In 2019, he was appointed head coach of Al-Jazeera Club in the Jordanian Pro League, a position he held until March 2019. After that, he coached Al Urooba, where he now coaches.

References

External links
 
 Croatian coach who won Kuwait: I want to lead Rijeka in the future 
 Dalibor Starčević won the Prince's Cup: The success of the Rijeka expert on the bench of Kuwaiti Qadsija
 Dalibor: We will fight to win «Super»
 Dalibor Starčević, coach of Krka: At the beginning we did well, so everything looked different 
 Dalibor Starčević: I want to take this business seriously!

1975 births
Living people
Footballers from Rijeka
Association football defenders
Croatian footballers
HNK Orijent players
NK Primorje players
NK Pomorac 1921 players
NK Istra 1961 players
FC Koper players
HNK Rijeka players
NK Inter Zaprešić players
Croatian Football League players
Slovenian PrvaLiga players
Croatian expatriate footballers
Expatriate footballers in Slovenia
Croatian expatriate sportspeople in Slovenia
Croatian football managers
Qadsia SC managers
Al-Jazeera (Jordan) managers
Al-Fahaheel FC managers
Croatian expatriate football managers
Expatriate football managers in Kuwait
Croatian expatriate sportspeople in Kuwait
Expatriate football managers in Jordan
Croatian expatriate sportspeople in Jordan
Expatriate football managers in the United Arab Emirates
Croatian expatriate sportspeople in the United Arab Emirates